Idd Mohamed Azzan (born 8 July 1965) is a Tanzanian CCM politician and Member of Parliament for Kinondoni constituency since 2005.

References

1965 births
Living people
Chama Cha Mapinduzi MPs
Tanzanian MPs 2005–2010
Tanzanian MPs 2010–2015